The 2002 Major League Soccer season was the seventh season of Major League Soccer. It was also the 90th season of FIFA-sanctioned soccer in the United States, and the 24th with a national first-division league.

On January 8, 2002, the league folded two of its teams. The Miami Fusion F.C. ceased operations after only four years in existence due to low attendance and an unfavorable stadium deal. The Tampa Bay Mutiny also ceased operations due to the lack of local ownership. the league eliminated the Central Division and returned to the original two-conference alignment.

According to FC Dallas president Dan Hunt, the entire league nearly folded during the 2001 offseason. The owners agreed to shut down the league on a conference call in November 2001, but within two days Lamar Hunt convinced the other owners to give the league another year.

Standings

Conference 

Top eight teams with the highest points clinch play-off berth, regardless of conference.x = Playoff berthy = Conference Winner (Season)s = Supporters Shield/Conference winner (Season)				
New England Revolution wins first tiebreaker vs. Columbus Crew (head-to-head: 2-1-1)Dallas Burn wins first tiebreaker vs. Colorado Rapids (head-to-head: 2-1-1)

Overall 

Source: MLSSoccer.comRules for classification: 1st points; 2nd head-to-head record; 3rd goal difference; 4th number of goals scored.(SS) = MLS Supporters' Shield; (E1) = Eastern Conference champion; (W1) = Western Conference championOnly applicable when the season is not finished:(Q) = Qualified for the MLS Cup Playoffs, but not yet to the particular round indicated; (E) = Eliminated from playoff-contention.

  – Since Los Angeles Galaxy won MLS Cup 2002 and the Supporters' Shield, San Jose Earthquakes qualified for the CONCACAF Champions Cup by finishing as Supporters' Shield runners-up.
  – Since MetroStars and D.C. United finished outside of the top eight in the league standings, they enter the U.S. Open Cup in the third round proper rather than fourth.

MLS Cup Playoffs

Bracket

Points systemWin = 3 Pts.Loss = 0 Pts.Draw = 1 Pt.
ASDET*=Added Sudden Death Extra Time (Game tie breaker)SDET**=Sudden Death Extra Time (Series tie breaker)Teams will advance at 5 points.

Quarterfinals

Los Angeles Galaxy advance 6-3 on points.

New England Revolution advance 6–3 on points.

Columbus Crew advance 6–0 on points.

Colorado Rapids advance in series (sudden death) overtime, after 4–4 tie on points.

Semifinals

Los Angeles Galaxy advance 6–0 on points.

New England Revolution advance 5–2 on points.

MLS Cup

Attendance

Player statistics

Goals

Played for more than one team – Most Recent Team Listed*

Awards

References

External links
MLS Site

 
Major League Soccer seasons
1